Brege Airport  is an airport in Serbia, located in the vicinity of the city of Kraljevo (about 2.5 km southeast from the center). It is used for sports and training flights for aircraft and gliders, parachuting jumps.

See also 
Aeroeast

Airports in Serbia